Sir Peter Henry Berry Otway Smithers  (9 December 1913 in Yorkshire, England – 8 June 2006 in Vico Morcote, Switzerland) was a United Kingdom Conservative Party politician. He was Member of Parliament for Winchester for 14 years, and a junior Minister in the early 1960s. He also served as Secretary General of the Council of Europe from 1964 to 1969.

Life
He was educated at Hawtreys, Harrow School and Magdalen College, Oxford. He received a First Class Honours Degree in modern history. He was called to the bar from the Inner Temple in 1936.

Smithers became an officer in the Royal Naval Volunteer Reserve in 1937 and by 1958 he retired as a lieutenant commander. During the Second World War he was associated with intelligence work, being a friend and colleague of Ian Fleming, who arranged for Smithers' diplomatic career. Smithers' Financial Times obituary suggests he was the model for Fleming's most famous character, Commander James Bond. Other possibilities are discussed in Inspirations for James Bond.

He received a number of diplomatic postings, being Assistant Naval Attaché at Washington, D.C., and Acting Naval Attaché at Mexico City (also covering part of Central America).

Smithers served as a councillor on Winchester Rural District Council (later amalgamated into Winchester City Council) 1946–50. He was elected as MP for Winchester at the 1950 general election and sat until he resigned in January 1964 on his appointment to the Council of Europe post. He had previously been a British delegate to the council. He was Parliamentary Private Secretary to a number of Ministers before becoming Parliamentary Under Secretary of State at the Foreign Office 1962–1964.

Smithers was knighted in the 1970 New Year Honours.

At the end of his life, he was a Swiss citizen. He died on 8 June 2006 in Vico Morcote, Ticino, Switzerland, at the age of 92.

References
 Who's Who of British Members of Parliament: Volume IV 1945-1979, edited by M. Stenton and S. Lees (The Harvester Press 1981)

External links 
 
 Daily Telegraph obituary
 Financial Times obituary
 Official Homepage

1913 births
2006 deaths
Royal Navy officers
People educated at Harrow School
Council of Europe Secretaries-General
Councillors in Hampshire
Conservative Party (UK) MPs for English constituencies
Knights Bachelor
Alumni of Magdalen College, Oxford
UK MPs 1950–1951
UK MPs 1951–1955
UK MPs 1955–1959
UK MPs 1959–1964
Royal Naval Volunteer Reserve personnel of World War II
Military personnel from Yorkshire
British politicians who committed suicide
World War II spies for the United Kingdom
British expatriates in the United States
Ministers in the Macmillan and Douglas-Home governments, 1957–1964
People with acquired Swiss citizenship